Ivan G'Vera (born Ivan Šplíchal; April 1, 1959) is a Czech actor, best known for his role as Ivan Marais on the American soap opera Days of Our Lives from 1991 to 2000, 2011 and 2020.

Biography 
At age 18, he fled Czechoslovakia for the United States, attended college, and later became an actor, adopting the stage name "Ivan G'Vera." He was nominated for the "Outstanding Scene Stealer" Soap Opera Digest Award in 1998. G'Vera is now a naturalized citizen of the United States.

Filmography

References

See also

External links 

1959 births
American male soap opera actors
Czech male television actors
Living people
Male actors from Prague
Czechoslovak emigrants to the United States
Naturalized citizens of the United States